Leanne Baker (born 8 January 1981) is a former New Zealand professional tennis player, and a former United States club rugby player. She is currently the head coach of the Chicago Women's Rugby Football Club.

Her tennis career-high singles ranking is world No. 260, which she reached on 26 February 2007. Her career-high doubles ranking is No. 108, set at 17 January 2005.

WTA career finals

Doubles: 1 (0–1)

ITF Circuit finals

Singles: 10 (7–3)

Doubles: 38 (18–20)

References 

Baker wins Mazatlan Title
Baker out of Mexico after a tough three setter – 12 April 2008
Leanne Baker in Mexico – 11 April 2008
Leanne Baker Back On The Circuit – 11 April 2008

External links
 
 

1981 births
Living people
New Zealand female tennis players
Sportspeople from Hamilton, New Zealand
People from Te Awamutu